Tom Erlandson may refer to:
 Tom Erlandson (linebacker, born 1940), NFL linebacker for the Denver Broncos, Miami Dolphins, San Diego Chargers, and Washington State University
 Tom Erlandson (linebacker, born 1966), NFL linebacker for the Buffalo Bills and Washington Huskies
 Tom Erlandon, a member of the Chautauqua County Legislature in Chautauqua County, New York